Susan Alexjander is an American sound artist, musical composer and teacher living and working in Portland, Oregon.  Finding inspiration in the natural world and in science, she is fascinated by the vibrational frequencies of natural phenomena, ranging widely from the microscopic (elements, DNA) to the macroscopic (body rhythms, water, stars, time).  She has created a microtonal system based on the frequencies of DNA, transforming natural vibrational patterns into sounds to create music. She has collaborated with both scientists and artists, and her compositions have been performed both nationally and internationally.

Education 
Alexjander received a B.A. in English Literature, with teaching credentials, in 1966. She received a master's degree in Theory and Composition from San Jose State University, California in 1982.  Although her initial musical training was classical, she became interested in the gamelan and explored Indian classical music, studying and performing with Lou Harrison.

Teaching
Alexjander has taught at San Jose State and Goddard College and has been an adjunct faculty member of Union Institute in Sacramento, California. She also presents workshops on the physics and metaphysics of sound. She is the Director of Science & The Arts, founded in Aptos, California to investigate the  frequencies of the universe and their musical properties.

Compositions and collaborations

In one of her earliest collaborations, with  biologist David W. Deamer from the University of California, Alexjander created music based on movements of the atoms and molecules that make up human DNA. An infrared spectrophotometer was used to measure the wavelength of infrared light absorbed by sections of DNA and to identify frequencies for each DNA molecule. The ratios of the light frequencies were then converted into perceptible ratios of sound frequencies, often involving microtonal changes, to create "strange, beautiful music". The resulting album Sequencia, a pioneering experiment in sound creation, was recorded on Earth Day, 1990.  Its tuning system, a type of Just intonation, is based on the molecular frequencies of the four bases of DNA:  adenine, guanine, cytosine and thymine. It includes 60 tones over a range of two-and-a-half octaves, around a spontaneous "tonal center". Alexjander's compositions in this tonal system are influenced by the microtonal nature of Indian classical music.

Other collaborations include: 
 film soundtracks for video installations Into Being - The River (2003),  Zero Waiting (2005) and Fragile Memories (2015)  with filmmaker Diana Hobson
 Music for Rebecca Kamen's installation Divining Nature: An Elemental Garden (2010)
 Eikos (2012) for violin, synthesizer and dancer Lavinia Magliocco
 Traces of the Cosmos (2012) with Jan Madill (painter)
 Coming On The Backs of Whales, soundtrack for Ocean with a room-sized cloth sculpture by Thais Mazur and cinema photography by Lisa Denning
 Crazy Jane performances with Cascadia Composers
 Continuum (2015) multimedia installation, in collaboration with sculptor Rebecca Kamen, featuring Portal: Black Holes/White Holes (2015) and NeuroCantos. In Portal Alexjander creates a soundscape using sonic frequencies to represent a pair of orbiting black holes, in honor of the 100th anniversary of Albert Einstein’s discovery of general relativity In NeuroCantos, Alexjander combines sounds based on neurons firing, with the words of poet Steven J. Fowler and scientist Santiago Ramón y Cajal.

Awards  
 Fellowship, Alden B. Dow Creativity Center, Midland, Michigan, to explore the geometry of the mineral kingdom as musical data
 Composer's Residency at Leighton Studios in Banff, Alberta, Canada

References

American sound artists
Women sound artists
Year of birth missing (living people)
Living people
American women composers
American experimental musicians
21st-century American composers
Gamelan musicians
Just intonation composers
Musicians from Portland, Oregon
San Jose State University alumni
20th-century American women musicians
20th-century American musicians
20th-century American composers
21st-century American women musicians
20th-century women composers
21st-century women composers